Lalthlamuong Keivom (15 July 1939 – 28 November 2021) was an Indian diplomat, writer and composer of Mizo literature and Hmar literature.  Keivom was nicknamed Zoram Khawvel Pa after his treatise Zoram Khawvel and for his contribution towards the integration of Zo people.

Career
Lalthlamuong Keivom started his career as a teacher in Manipur in 1963, he later joined Sielmat Christian College, Lamka (1966–67) after which he was with the Indian Revenue Service from 1967 to 1970. In 1970 he joined the Indian Foreign Service. During his service period as an IFS Officer he was posted in different countries: Nairobi, Kenya (1976–80); Jeddah, Saudi Arabia (1980–83); Wellington, New Zealand (1983–85); Rangoon, Burma (1986–90); Milan, Italy (1990–93); Male, Maldives (1994–97). Towards the end of his diplomatic career he was posted to Delhi (1997–2002) and retired in 2002 and engaged in literature till his death.

Awards
Book of the Year Award 1991 (Zoram Khawvel), Mizo Academy of Letters
Zosapthara Award, Mizo Literary Association, 1998 
Zofa Global Award at Zofa Global Unity Festival, Zokhawthar, Indo-Myanmar Border, Mizoram by Zofa Global Network, 2014
ZOFEST Award by Mizo Zirlai Pawl General Headquarters, 2014

Publications
L. Keivom has written and published more than 20 books in Hmar: 
Thralai Hlabu (1963); 
Hmar Hla Suina (1980); 
Zangkhaw Bungbu (2000); 
Nun Ram, Ka Nun (2001); 
Baibul (Hmar)-Holy Bible, Delhi Version (2007)
Rabindranath Tagore's Nobel Prize winning work
The Gitanjali (translated in 1974 and now in the press).

In Mizo: 
Zoram Khawvel 1–8, Bawktlang Thawnthu
Thuthlung Ram 
Pherzawl Titi
L.KeivomThukhawchang 1–2

See also
 Mizo literature

References

External links

1939 births
2021 deaths
Indian diplomats
Mizo people
Indian male writers